The Japanese amberjack or yellowtail, Seriola quinqueradiata, is a species of jack fish in the family Carangidae. It is native to the northwest Pacific Ocean, ranging from China (called ), Korea (called ), and Japan to Hawaii.

It is greatly appreciated in Japan, where it is called hamachi or buri. These fish are eaten either cooked or raw and are a seasonal favourite in the colder months when the meat has a higher fat content. Amberjack is typically thought of as a winter delicacy of Toyama and the Hokuriku region. Although it is frequently listed on menus as "yellowtail tuna," it is a fish of an entirely different family, the Carangidae, rather than the family Scombridae that includes tunas, mackerels, and bonitos.

Some of the fish consumed are caught wild, but a substantial amount is farmed (about 120,000 tonnes per year). To populate the pens, every May, workers fish for the small wild fry (called mojako), which can be found under floating seaweed. They scoop out the seaweed together with the mojako and put the mojako in cages in the sea.

The small fry grow until they reach 10 to 50 grams in mass; the fry are called inada in eastern Japan (Kantō). They are then sold to aquaculturists, who grow them until they reach 3 kilograms (youth, called hamachi) or 5 kilograms (adult, called buri).  These days, most aquaculturists use extruded pellets to feed the fish.

References

External links
 

Fish described in 1845
Fish of Hawaii
Fish of Japan
Japanese seafood
Seriola
Fish of Korea